Samuel Barrett Miles (2 October 1838 – 28 August 1914) was a British Army officer who served as a diplomat in various Arabic-speaking countries, notably Oman, which he came to know better than any other European of the time. The notes that he made were published after his death as The Countries and Tribes of the Persian Gulf.

Early years

Samuel Barrett Miles was born on 2 October 1838, the son of Major-General Miles.
His father was in the military service of the East India Company.
Miles was educated at Harrow. He joined the British Indian Army in 1857, the year of the Indian Mutiny. He entered the 7th Regiment of Bombay Native Infantry as an ensign, was promoted to lieutenant in 1860 and became regimental quarter-master in 1864. In November 1866 he moved with his regiment to Aden. The next year he was appointed Cantonment Magistrate and Assistant Resident at Aden.

Political agent in the Gulf region

The regiment returned to India in March 1869. Soon after, Miles applied for a transfer to the Political Service.
His first appointment was to Balochistan, where he stayed on the Makran coast.
Miles was appointed Political Agent and Consul at Muscat, in Oman, in October 1872.
He spent most of his subsequent career as a political agent in Oman.
Other appointments included Political Agent in Turkish Arabia, Consul-General of Baghdad (1879), Political Agent and Consul-General of Zanzibar (1881), Political Agent in the North West Province and Oudh (1885) and Political Resident in the Persian Gulf.

Miles came to Oman during the reign of Turki bin Said (1871–1888), whom the British had assisted in ending the conservative religious revolution of Azzan bin Qais.
Miles made several journeys from Muscat into the interior of the country to gain a better understanding of the people for diplomatic purposes. He was an Arabist and Orientalist, and developed a deep knowledge of the history and the people of the region, recording his findings in copious notes.
He described the country, architecture, local customs, social conditions, agriculture and fishing.
His erudition allowed him to detect echoes of the distant past in modern times.
He noted that India and Arabia still used a measure of weight that had been used in ancient Nineveh.

Later career

Miles was acting Political Resident in the Gulf from 1885 until October 1886.
In 1887 he returned to India where he was promoted to Colonel. He was Political Resident at Mewar from 1887 to 1893, when he retired from the army and returned to England.
Miles wrote several papers that were published by the Royal Geographical Society.
He married Ellen Marie Kay in 1877. They had one son, Harry William Miles, who was killed during World War I (1914–1918).

Samuel Barrett Miles died on 28 August 1914 aged 75.
He had intended to work up his notes into a book, but went blind several years before he died. 
Five years later his widow published the work he had completed as The Countries and Tribes of the Persian Gulf.

Bibliography
Published work by Samuel Barrett Miles include:

Tenets of the Ibadhi sect 
Outlines of the history of Oman, 1728–1883
Note on the tribes of Oman 
Note on the sect of Ibadhiyah of Oman

References
Citations

Sources

1838 births
1914 deaths
British Indian Army officers
People educated at Harrow School
British Arabists

British orientalists

History of Oman